Leucon II of Bosporus (c. 240 – 220 BC), also known as Leuco, seems to have been the second son of Paerisades II and a Spartocid ruler of the Bosporan Kingdom in 240 BC.

Reign
Leucon killed his brother, Spartocus IV, after discovering that he had been engaged in an adulterous affair with Leukon's wife, Alcathoe, and assumed the throne. Supposedly, Alcathoe later killed Leucon in an act of revenge.

Leucon also supposedly endured an economic crisis in the 3rd century BC, when he minted new coins with his own name, in order to maintain his kingdom. He was the first Bosporan king to issue coins with his own name.

Succession
He was succeeded by Hygiaenon after his death. Hygiaenon was not a member of the Spartocid dynasty and may have been a supporter of Camasarye, the daughter and heiress of Spartocus IV.

References

Bibliography

External links
Collection of coins from the reign of Leucon II here

3rd-century BC monarchs
Monarchs of the Bosporan Kingdom
Spartocid dynasty